Llámame may refer to:

 "Llámame" (WRS song), a song by WRS that was selected to represent Romania in the Eurovision Song Contest 2022
 "Llámame", a song by Víctor Balaguer that was selected to represent Spain in the Eurovision Song Contest 1962
 "Llámame", the Spanish-language version of "Call Me" by Blondie (1980)
 "Llámame", a song by Raymix